The Northwest Aeronautical Institute is an aviation school located in Tijuana, Mexico.

The school was founded on January 28, 1982. It is based at the GAB Terminal of the Tijuana International Airport. It operates training flights to Ensenada Airport and Real del Castillo Airstrip.

The curriculum covers degree programs in the aviation fields to become a private pilot, commercial pilot, flight instructor, and flight attendant.

Incidents
 On January 16, 2009, while performing a training flight, a school's Piper Cherokee suffered a sudden shutdown from its engine, forcing the pilot to make an emergency landing at the Tijuana International Airport. The aircraft maneuvered and landed safely at the airport, but the aircraft had suffered other damages. Aviation was closed for almost an hour at General Aviation Terminal of the airport. The two people on board were safe, with only a few minor scratches.

References

External links
  www.institutoaeronautico.com.mx

Education in Tijuana
Aviation in Mexico